The Yokohama Mosque or Ja'me Masjid, Yokohama is a mosque in Yokohama City, Kanagawa Prefecture, Japan.

History
The mosque was established on 29 December 2006.

Architecture
The mosque also consists of classrooms and kitchen.

Transportation
The mosque is accessible within walking distance south of Higashi-Yamata Station of Yokohama Municipal Subway.

See also
 Islam in Japan
 List of mosques in Japan

References

External links
 

2006 establishments in Japan
Buildings and structures in Yokohama
Mosques completed in 2006